Below is a list of unions affiliated with the AFL–CIO. Since the founding of the AFL in 1886, the AFL–CIO and its predecessor bodies have been the dominant labor federation (at least in terms of the number of member workers, if not influence) in the United States. As of 2014, the labor federation had approximately 12.7 million members. As of 2015, the AFL–CIO had 56 member unions.

Historical context

AFL forms
On December 8, 1886, the five-year-old Federation of Organized Trades and Labor Unions dissolved itself and became the American Federation of Labor (AFL). In its first half-century, a large number of trade and labor unions formed, joined the AFL, and either merged with other unions or ceased to exist. Many unions, particularly those in the construction industry and affiliated building trades, disaffiliated from the AFL for a variety of reasons. Some rejoined; some did not.

Throughout the AFL's history, jurisdictional issues caused a number of disaffiliations. In contrast to its early rival, the Knights of labor, the AFL had adopted a policy of forming and admitting to membership (with a few limited, and notable, exceptions such as the United Mine Workers and Brewery Workers) only craft unions—unions whose membership was limited to workers with a single, narrow skill-set. But industrialization, with its emphasis on teams rather than individual workers manufacturing a product, disadvantaged craft unions in the drive to organize workers. A notable example was the effort to unionize the steel industry, where the Amalgamated Association of Iron and Steel Workers' adherence to craft unionism was a factor in the failure of many unionization drives. Some unions, including some large ones such as the Mine Workers, began advocating for a shift toward industrial unionism, where a union would organize all workers (regardless of skills) in a single company, market, or industry.

CIO splits, 1936–1955
The battle between the craft and industrial union philosophies led to a major membership loss for the AFL in 1935. In the first years of the Great Depression, a number of AFL member unions advocated for a relaxation of the strict "craft union only" membership policy but to no avail. In 1932, Mine Workers president John L. Lewis privately proposed to several like-minded union presidents that those unions which wanted to organize workers on an industrial basis form a group to begin to do just that. The group met informally for three years, and lost a number of jurisdictional battles over potential or newly organized workers. Eight national unions formally organized themselves into the Committee for Industrial Organization (CIO) on November 9, 1935. On September 10, 1936, the AFL suspended all 10 CIO unions (two more had joined in the previous year) and their four million members. In 1938, these unions formed the Congress of Industrial Organizations as a rival labor federation.

Over the next 20 years, both the AFL and CIO would lose member unions. The AFL would purge some member unions for advocating industrial unionism (notably the United Auto Workers and the United Rubber Workers) or for supporting political philosophies it felt were antithetical to its purposes. It also reaffiliated some unions which had joined the CIO. The CIO, for its part, expelled a number of unions in 1948 after concluding they had become infiltrated by Communists (at least one additional union disaffiliated rather than be expelled). Both the AFL and CIO would form new unions to compete with those they had expelled, with varying degrees of success.

AFL–CIO, 1955–1999
By the early 1950s, however, the disagreement over craft and industrial unionism had largely ceased to exist. In 1955, the AFL and CIO merged to forming a new entity known as the American Federation of Labor–Congress of Industrial Organizations (AFL–CIO). Over the next five decades, the AFL–CIO continued to gain and lose member unions. After a series of particularly divisive union raids on one another as well as repeated jurisdictional squabbles, the AFL adopted Article 20 of its constitution, which prevented its member unions from raiding one another—a policy retained in the AFL–CIO constitution. Theoretically, violation of Article 20 could lead to expulsion, but corruption soon became much more important than jurisdictional issues. After hearings by the Senate Select Committee on Improper Activities in Labor and Management led to major revelations regarding the dominance of several AFL-CIO unions by organized crime, new rules were enacted by the AFL–CIO's Executive Council that provided for the removal of vice presidents engaged in corruption as well as the ejection of unions considered corrupt. The labor federation expelled the International Brotherhood of Teamsters on corruption charges on December 6, 1957.

Membership changes continued, albeit at a markedly lower level, throughout the last four decades of the 20th century. On a few occasions, unions in the construction industry disaffiliated and reaffiliated. The most important membership changes, however, occurred in 1968. The United Auto Workers (UAW) disaffiliated from the AFL-CIO on July 1, 1968, after UAW President Walter Reuther and AFL–CIO President George Meany could not come to agreement on a wide range of national public policy issues or on reforms regarding AFL–CIO governance. A few days after the UAW's disaffiliation, the UAW and the Teamsters formed a new labor federation, the Alliance for Labor Action (ALA). Several smaller AFL–CIO unions either joined the ALA and were expelled from the AFL–CIO for dual unionism or disaffiliated and joined the ALA. The ALA was not successful, however, and ceased to exist in January 1972. Over the years, most of the unions which had been expelled or left the AFL–CIO rejoined it.  For example, the UAW re-affiliated on July 1, 1981, and the Teamsters did so on October 24, 1987.

21st century
The AFL–CIO saw several disaffiliations in the first decade of the 21st century. The United Brotherhood of Carpenters and Joiners of America disaffiliated from the AFL–CIO on March 29, 2001, disagreeing with the labor federation's rapid expansion in spending. After lengthy debate and disagreement over dues levels, the governance structure, the leadership, and the philosophy of the AFL–CIO, the Laborers' International Union of North America, Service Employees International Union, Teamsters, UNITE HERE, United Farm Workers, and United Food and Commercial Workers disaffiliated from the AFL–CIO to form the Change to Win, a new national union federation. The Carpenters joined the new federation as well.

After the split, the AFL–CIO gained two new members. The 100,000-member independent California School Employees Association joined the federation in August 2001, and the 65,000-member independent California Nurses Association joined in March 2007. After a lengthy and divisive internal leadership struggle within UNITE HERE, 100,000 members of the union's apparel division disaffiliated from the national union in March 2009, formed a new union called Workers United, and affiliated their union with SEIU. The remaining 265,000 members of UNITE HERE reaffiliated with the AFL–CIO on September 16, 2009.

LIUNA rejoined the AFL–CIO in August 2010. Three years later, UFCW did as well. The National Football League Players Association (NFLPA) was decertified in 2010 as players faced a lockout, but reformed and rejoined the AFL–CIO in 2011. The National Taxi Workers Alliance (also known as the New York Taxi Workers Alliance) affiliated with the AFL–CIO as well. It was the first non-traditional workers' organization to do so since the early 1960s. However, the International Longshore and Warehouse Union disaffiliated from the federation on August 30, 2013, accusing the AFL–CIO of unwillingness to punish other unions when their members crossed ILWU picket lines and over federal legislative policy issues.

AFL–CIO membership criteria
Article III of the AFL–CIO constitution, as amended, addresses membership in the AFL–CIO. Membership is limited to national and international unions and to certain subordinate bodies of the AFL–CIO (such as organizing committees, directly affiliated local unions, departments, and state and local central labor bodies). Article III, Section 4(a) gives the Executive Council (or the President, if the Executive Council so designates) the power to approve new affiliations, and restricts new affiliates to union whose jurisdiction does not conflict with the jurisdiction of existing members (unless the existing members authorize such affiliation).

 Article III, Section 4(b) provides for provisional charters and the attaching of conditions to provisional charters. Section 5 declares that charters shall not be revoked without a two-thirds affirmative vote of the convention, and for the restoration of charters upon a two-thirds vote of either the convention or Executive Council. Section 7 provides for the expulsion of member unions if they are "officered, controlled or dominated by persons whose policies and activities are consistently directed toward the achievement of the program or purposes of authoritarianism, totalitarianism, terrorism and other forces that suppress individual liberties and freedom of association".

 Article X, Section 8 gives the Executive Council the authority to investigate "any situation in which there is reason to believe that any affiliate is dominated, controlled or substantially influenced in the conduct of its affairs by any corrupt influence" and upon a two-thirds vote suspend any member found to be so influenced. Article X, Section 17 permits the Executive Council to establish a code of ethical conduct for the AFL–CIO, its departments and councils, and its staff; to require member unions to also establish such codes; and upon a two-thirds vote to suspend any member found to be in violation of such codes.

Article III, Section 8, amended in 2005, establishes that it is the official policy of the AFL–CIO to encourage its members with overlapping and/or conflicting jurisdiction to merge, to encourage smaller unions to merge into larger ones, and to encourage member unions to reduce overlapping jurisdiction.

Article IV of the AFL–CIO constitution provides for representation of members at the quadrennial convention. Article X of the AFL–CIO constitution provides for an Executive Council, and for representation of members on this council.

Article XI of the AFL–CIO constitution provides for a General Board, and for representation of members on this board.

Currently affiliated unions
This is a list of AFL–CIO affiliated member unions:

Air Line Pilots Association (ALPA)
Amalgamated Transit Union (ATU)
American Federation of Government Employees (AFGE)
American Federation of Musicians of the United States and Canada (AFM)
American Federation of School Administrators (AFSA)
American Federation of State, County and Municipal Employees (AFSCME)
American Federation of Teachers (AFT)
American Postal Workers Union (APWU)
American Radio Association (ARA)
American Train Dispatchers Association (ATDA)
Associated Actors and Artistes of America (4As)
Actors' Equity Association (AEA)
American Guild of Musical Artists (AGMA)
American Guild of Variety Artists (AGVA)
The Guild of Italian American Actors (GIAA)
Screen Actors Guild-American Federation of Television and Radio Artists (SAG-AFTRA)
Bakery, Confectionery, Tobacco Workers and Grain Millers' International Union (BCTGM)
Brotherhood of Railroad Signalmen (BRS)
California School Employees Association (CSEA)
Communications Workers of America (CWA)
Association of Flight Attendants (AFA-CWA)
Industrial Division, CWA (IUE-CWA)
National Association of Broadcast Employees and Technicians (NABET-CWA)
The Newspaper Guild (TNG-CWA)
Printing, Publishing and Media Workers (PPMW-CWA)
Farm Labor Organizing Committee (FLOC)
Gay and Lesbian Labor Activists Network (GALLAN)
International Alliance of Theatrical Stage Employees, Moving Picture Technicians, Artists and Allied Crafts of the United States, Its Territories and Canada (IATSE)
International Association of Bridge, Structural, Ornamental and Reinforcing Iron Workers (Ironworkers)
International Association of Fire Fighters (IAFF)
International Association of Heat and Frost Insulators and Allied Workers
International Association of Machinists and Aerospace Workers (IAM)
Transportation Communications International Union
International Association of Sheet Metal, Air, Rail and Transportation Workers (SMART)
International Brotherhood of Boilermakers, Iron Ship Builders, Blacksmiths, Forgers and Helpers (IBB)
International Brotherhood of Electrical Workers (IBEW)
International Federation of Professional and Technical Engineers (IFPTE)
International Longshoremen's Association (ILA)
International Organization of Masters, Mates & Pilots (MMP)
International Plate Printers, Die Stampers and Engravers Union of North America
International Union of Allied Novelty and Production Workers (Novelty and Production Workers)
International Union of Bricklayers and Allied Craftworkers (BAC)
International Union of Elevator Constructors (IUEC)
International Union of Operating Engineers (IUOE)
International Union of Painters and Allied Trades (IUPAT)
International Union of Police Associations (IUPA)
Laborers' International Union of North America (LIUNA)
National Postal Mail Handlers Union (NPMHU)
Major League Baseball Players Association (MLBPA)
Marine Engineers Beneficial Association (MEBA)
National Air Traffic Controllers Association (NATCA)
National Association of Letter Carriers (NALC)
National Football League Players Association (NFLPA)
National Nurses United (NNU)
National Taxi Workers' Alliance (NTWA)
National Women's Soccer League Players Association (NWSLPA)
Office and Professional Employees International Union (OPEIU)
Operative Plasterers' and Cement Masons' International Association of the United States and Canada (OPCMIA)
Professional Aviation Safety Specialists (PASS)
Seafarers International Union of North America (SIU)
American Maritime Officers (AMO)
Transport Workers Union of America (TWU)
UNITE HERE
United Association of Journeymen and Apprentices of the Plumbing and Pipe Fitting Industry of the United States and Canada (UA)
United Automobile, Aerospace and Agricultural Implement Workers of America International Union (UAW)
United Food and Commercial Workers (UFCW)
United Mine Workers of America (UMWA)
United Steelworkers (USW)
United Union of Roofers, Waterproofers and Allied Workers (Roofers and Waterproofers)
Utility Workers Union of America (UWUA)
Writers Guild of America, East Inc. (WGAE)

Formerly affiliated unions

Disaffiliated and re-affiliated
International Brotherhood of Teamsters (IBT or Teamsters) – expelled by AFL–CIO in 1957 for corruption; re-affiliated with AFL–CIO in 1987; disaffiliated in 2005 and became founding member union of Change to Win
Laborers' International Union of North America (LIUNA) – founding member union of Change to Win in 2005, but re-affiliated with the AFL–CIO in 2010
UNITE HERE – founding member union of Change to Win in 2005, but re-affiliated with the AFL–CIO in 2009
United Auto Workers (UAW) – disaffiliated in 1968 to form the Alliance for Labor Action with the Teamsters, re-affiliated in 1981
United Food and Commercial Workers – founding member union of Change to Win in 2005, but re-affiliated with the AFL–CIO in 2013

See also
 Affiliated unions of the Canadian Labour Congress
 Global list of trade unions

References

External links
 Unions of the AFL–CIO, at the AFL–CIO official Web site

AFL–CIO
AFL-CIO